Amirsalar Davoudi (امیرسالار داوودی) is an Iranian human rights lawyer born on 21 June 1981. He was sentenced to 30 years in prison and 111 lashes for his human rights work.

The charges on which he has been convicted include "insulting officials", "insulting the Supreme Leader", and "spreading propaganda against the system". He was arrested on 20 November 2018 and has been detained in Tehran's Evin prison with extremely limited access to his family and lawyer.

Amnesty International calls for his immediate and unconditional release.

Davoudi, in the past years, has been defending some of Iranian political prisoners and religious and ethnic minorities. He was also active on social media criticizing the violation of human rights in his country.

Arrest 
On 20 November 2018 security forces arrested Davoudi in his office in Tehran and transferred him to Evin prison where many other political prisoners are kept.

His arrest was part of a crackdown against active lawyers. Davoudi was among four lawyers arrested for their human rights activities.

Charges and sentence 

On 1 June 2019 Amirsalar Davoudi was sentenced to 30 years in jail plus 111 lashes. Branch 15 of the Tehran Revolutionary Court, presided over by Abolqasem Salavati sentenced Amirsalar to 111 lashes and a total of 30 years in prison1; 15 years for “forming a group to overthrow the political system” (through his Telegram channel, "No Retouch" where he discussed breaches in judicial processes, the judicial harassment of lawyers and human rights abuses), “propaganda against the system” (for his interviews with VOA), “publishing lies”and “insulting officials and the leader” amongst other charges. On 30 July 2019, his sentence was upheld.

Davoudi’s lawyer, Vahid Moshkani Farahani, said in an interview with Modara website, “Besides the 30 years of imprisonment in which 15 years will be implemented, Mr Davoudi has been sentenced to 111 lashes, a fine of Rls.60 million (around US$4,000) court fine and deprivation of his social rights for two years.”

Hunger Strike 
In its annual report in February 2020, Amnesty International reported that Lawyer and human rights activist Amirsalar Daoudi, who is presently jailed at Tehran Evin prison, has been on hunger strike since 9 February 2020.

International reaction 
Philip Luther, Research and Advocacy Director for the Middle East and North Africa to the Amnesty International, called Davoudi's detainment a shocking injustice and that he was being punished for his advocating human rights. Philip Luther called for Davoudi's immediate release.

Awards 
 2019: Council of Bars and Law Societies of Europe (CCBE) Human Rights Award 
 2022: Ludovic-Trarieux International Human Rights Prize

See also
Nasrin Sotoudeh
Abdolfattah Soltani
Mohammad Seifzadeh
Kasra Nouri
Human rights in the Islamic Republic of Iran

References 

21st-century Iranian lawyers
Living people
Iranian human rights activists
Iranian prisoners and detainees
People convicted of spreading propaganda against the system by the Islamic Republic of Iran
1981 births